C8 and ATA Connection were the IATA code designator and DBA name of Chicago Express Airlines, which in its later years was doing business as ATA Connection, and was the trademark codeshare name and brand used by the renamed parent company of ATA Holdings Inc. for ATA Airlines (formerly known as American Trans Air), the principal operating unit for flights to smaller Midwestern cities.

History
C8 - the ATA Connection, as a branded regional feeder operation, ceased being used when the remaining assets of Chicago Express were completely divested from AMTRAN, INC.'s successor company early in 2006, and some months before that when the fleet was withdrawn from service, owned aircraft parked, and leased airplanes returned to their lease owners. Chicago Express, operating as the ATA Connection, flew British Aerospace Jetstream 31 turboprops which were then replaced with Saab 340 turboprops.  C8 was also the IATA code used when travel agencies were writing tickets upon Chicago Express routes, and booking travel between airlines not affiliated or owned by ATA. 

When the remains of Chicago Express (C8) were liquidated, the company was sold as Chicago Express, just as it read on the company's original airline operating certificate.  ATA Connection's imagery and logos do not live on, unlike BMI Regional's logos and trademarks after the buyout of parent airline BMI.

Industry perceptions

The type of arrangement the C8 code and ATA Connection's form of logo and branding separating the two, has in the past at other companies, led to many public and corporate perception problems. Examples of such would be Ransome Airlines, who much of the informed among the aviation industry, was under the impression had completely exited the business of aviation, when its parent company had collapsed in bankruptcy.  However, Ransome Airlines as  Trans World Express continued to operate for years to come, unbeknownst to many.

Similarly, for many lay individuals, when one sees the Pan Am emblem and logo emblazoned upon railways and airplanes at airports in literally identical Pan Am Clipper Connection or Pan Am Railways form, this tends to leave the impression to all, that the original business is still in place. As in the case of Pan Am Systems also unbeknownst to many, no business connection to the original Pan American World Airways exists, although Pan Am's distinctive logo who Pan Am System owns, has been through four generations of different corporate usage.

C8 the IATA code of ATA Connection, C8 the certificated airline and former subsidiary of  ATA Airlines parent company, and C8 the brand identified with ATA Connection are once and for all defunct. Amtran, and ATA Holdings continue to exist but in the renamed form of Global Aero Logistics.

ATA Airlines, a fully certificated airline carrier, IATA code TZ, ended operations in April 2008 as a result of the controlling interests of the MatlinPatterson hedge fund's reallocation of Amtran/ATA Holdings/ATA Airlines capital resources into the continued leveraged investments of DC-10 equipment, and World Airways / North American Airlines causing and resulting in the financial insolvency of ATA Airlines through these collateralized transactions.

(C8) The ATA Connection brand no longer exists.

Other similar brands
Allegheny Commuter
Midway Connection

See also 
 List of defunct airlines of the United States
 ATA Connection operated by Chicago Express Airlines Inc.

References

Defunct regional airline brands
Defunct regional airlines of the United States
Defunct airlines of the United States
Airlines based in Illinois
Airlines established in 1993
Airlines disestablished in 2008